John Millbank Delph (August 18, 1805 in Madison County, Virginia – December 15, 1891 in Louisville) was the eighth and fourteenth mayor of Louisville, Kentucky. His terms of office extended from May 13, 1850, to April 26, 1852, and April 6, 1861, to April 4, 1863.

Life
He was a carpenter by trade, but entered into real estate in Louisville and became wealthy. He held various public offices in Louisville and Jefferson County, including city tax collector, constable, sheriff and deputy marshall of the chancery court. He was the first mayor to serve under a new city charter that allowed a two-year term for mayors, as opposed to the earlier single-year term.

During his first term, the city experienced a Cholera epidemic, and Delph lead a push for better sanitation in Louisville. Though a member of the Whig Party during his first term, he became a Unionist and staunch supporter of the Union during and after that term.

He served a term in the state legislature after his second term as mayor. He was a founder of Walnut Street Baptist Church.

Delph died on December 15, 1891, in Louisville. He is buried in Cave Hill Cemetery.

See also
Louisville in the American Civil War
List of Mayors of Louisville, Kentucky

References

External links 

 https://louisville.cc/mayors/
 http://discovery.civilwargovernors.org/document/N00008156

People of Kentucky in the American Civil War
Mayors of Louisville, Kentucky
Burials at Cave Hill Cemetery
1805 births
1891 deaths
19th-century American politicians